Wildenfels is a municipality in Germany, Landkreis Zwickau in Saxony. It is situated 9 km southeast of Zwickau.

The construction of Wildenfels castle was begun before 1200 by the lords of Wildenfels. Between 1440 and 1706 it was a fief with Imperial immediacy. In 1602 it passed to the House of Solms which established the branch of Solms-Wildenfels. The counts of Solms-Wildenfels resided there until communist expropriation in 1945. Presently the castle is used for weddings and other events, partially for housing, the courtyards are accessible.

References 

Zwickau (district)